Yulukovo (Yulıq) is a rural locality (a selo) in Kovardinsky Selsoviet, Gafuriysky District, Bashkortostan, Russia. The population was 741 as of 2010. There are 8 streets.

Geography 
Yulukovo is located 50 km northeast of Krasnousolsky (the district's administrative centre) by road. Sabayevo is the nearest rural locality.

References 

Rural localities in Gafuriysky District